Martelia is a genus of tropical freshwater snails with an operculum, aquatic gastropod molluscs in the family Paludomidae.

Distribution of the genus Martelia includes the Lake Tanganyika only.

Species
Species within genus Martelia include:
 Martelia dautzenbergi Dupuis, 1924
 Martelia tanganyicensis Dautzenberg, 1908 - type species

References

Paludomidae
Taxonomy articles created by Polbot